General elections were held in Tunisia on 24 October 2004 to elect a President and Chamber of Deputies. In the presidential election, incumbent Zine El Abidine Ben Ali, was re-elected for a fourth five-year term with 94.49% of the vote. In the Chamber of Deputies elections his Constitutional Democratic Rally party won 152 of the 189 seats. Voter turnout was 91.52% in the presidential election and 86.41% for the Chamber election.

Results

President

Parliament

References

Tunisia
Elections in Tunisia
2004 in Tunisia
Presidential elections in Tunisia
October 2004 events in Africa